The Burgstein is a rock formation, about  high, in the valley of the Ilm in Langewiesen in the central German state of Thuringia. It is made from quartz porphyry and has been a geological natural monument since 1939.

It was formed when the Ilm carved out its valley and washed away the surrounding rock. When the Ilmenau–Großbreitenbach railway was built in 1881 it was exposed again because rock at its foot was removed in order to lay the railway track. The rock dates to the Pennsylvanian sub-period and belongs to the Möhrenbach Formation.

The origin of its name is not clear (Burgstein literally means "castle rock"). In Langewiesen, the road of Burgstein is named after the rock.

References

Rock formations of Thuringia
Natural monuments in Thuringia